Calpe Rowing Club is a rowing club near the Port of Gibraltar, based at 6 Europort Road, Gibraltar. The boathouse is next door to the Mediterranean Rowing Club.

History
The club was founded in 1876 and was the first overseas club affiliated to the Amateur Rowing Association of Great Britain. It is one of two clubs from Gibraltar that compete regularly at the British Rowing Championships, the other being the Mediterranean Rowing Club. Both clubs are also affiliated to the Gibraltar Amateur Rowing Association which in turn became affiliated to FISA in 1984. The club has produced multiple national British champions.

Honours

British champions

References

Sport in Gibraltar